Presidential elections were held in South Korea on 19 December 2007. The election was won by Lee Myung-bak of the Grand National Party, returning conservatives to the Blue House for the first time in ten years. Lee defeated Grand Unified Democratic New Party nominee Chung Dong-young and independent Lee Hoi-chang by a nearly 2-to-1 margin, the largest since direct elections were reintroduced in 1987. It also marked the first time a president-elect in Korea was under investigation by a prosecutor. Voter turnout was 63.0%, an all-time low according to the National Election Commission.

Background
On 28 February 2007 the official census was published, identifying the number of eligible voters, with the electoral rolls compiled and published between 21 and 26 November, before being finalised on 12 December. Pre-registration of candidates began on 23 April, with 25–26 November as the dates to officially register.

Candidates
The elections were a three-way race between the ruling Grand Unified Democratic New Party's Chung Dong-young, opposition Grand National Party's Lee Myung-bak, and conservative independent Lee Hoi-chang. Also in the race but polling less than 10% were former Yuhan Kimberly CEO Moon Kook-hyun and congressman Kwon Young-ghil from Ulsan.

Grand Unified Democratic New primaries

A total of nine candidates ran to be the Grand Unified Democratic New Party presidential candidate;
Chung Dong-young, former National Assemblyman from North Jeolla
Sohn Hak-kyu, former Governor of Gyeonggi
Lee Hae-chan, National Assemblyman from Seoul
Rhyu Si-min, National Assemblyman from Gyeonggi
Han Myeong-sook, National Assemblywoman for PR
Shin Ki-nam, National Assemblyman from Seoul
Chun Jung-bae, former Minister of Justice
Choo Mi-ae, National Assemblyman from Seoul
Kim Doo-kwan, former Minister of Interior

An opinion poll was conducted on 2,400 eligible voters and 10,000 of those who signed up to vote in the primaries between 3 and 5 September; only the top five candidates were allowed to advance to the full primary elections.

Despite qualifying for the full primary vote, Han Myeong-sook withdrew her bid for nomination and endorsed Lee Hae-chan before the primary races began. The primary races counted for 90% of the final result and the opinion poll 10%.

At the UNDP National Convention, held on October 15, 2007, Chung was officially named the party's presidential nominee.

Grand National primaries
Five candidates contested the primaries of the Grand National Party:
 Lee Myung-bak, former Mayor of Seoul
 Park Geun-hye, National Assemblywoman from Daegu
 Won Hee-ryong, National Assemblyman from Seoul
 Hong Joon-pyo, National Assemblyman from Seoul
 Go Jin-hwa, National Assemblyman from Seoul

Former Gyeonggi Governor Sohn Hak-kyu sought to participate, but he later decided to instead run for the UNDP nomination, and failed.

The GNP primary consisted of opinion polling (weighted 20%) and popular vote by pre-registered electors (weighted 80%). The poll and the voting were all conducted on 19 August and the results were announced at the National Convention on 20 August, naming Lee Myung-bak as the official nominee. Because Lee won the race with a slight margin, there was controversy regarding the method primary election used (opinion poll). However, Park Geun-hye conceded her loss to Lee. Park ran again in 2012 and won the primary.

Lee Hoi-chang
1997 and 2002 presidential candidate for GNP, Lee Hoi-chang had announced his candidacy on November 7, 2007 as an independent, not joining GNP primary.

Democratic Labor primary
The primary election of the Democratic Labour Party involved two types of voting;
 Online voting: All members of this party can log on to the official homepage to cast their vote. Confirmation process by cell phone is needed.
 Off-line voting: There are 227 voting stations around the nation. Voters can cast their vote from 09:00 to 22:00
The total number of party members that were eligible to cast a vote was 50,117.

Kwon Young-ghil, National Assemblyman from South Gyeongsang
Sim Sang-jung, National Assemblywoman as Proportional Representative
Roh Hoe-chan, National Assemblyman as Proportional Representative

No candidate received a majority of the votes, so a second round of the presidential primary was scheduled from 10 to 15 September.

First round results by province

Creative Korea primary
Moon Kook-hyun (문국현), former CEO of Yuhan Kimberly (Kimberly-Clark's company in Korea), was elected as the official presidential candidate of the party on 4 November 2007, through mobile voting amongst party members.

Exit polls
An exit poll was announced at 18:00 on election day, at which point voting had finished. It predicted Lee Myung-bak had won an absolute majority.

Results

By region

Major candidates 
Breakdown of votes by region for candidates with at least 1% of the total votes.

Minor candidates 
Breakdown of votes by region for candidates with less than 1% of the total votes.

Other information
On April 7, 2011, a National Intelligence Service agent was guilty of investigating Lee Myung-bak's secret real estate-related information before the election.

According to WikiLeaks, Yoo Chong-ha (유종하), the former co-chairman of Lee Myung-bak's presidential election campaign, requested to then American ambassador to South Korea, Alexander Vershbow, to delay the extraction of the main individual of the BBK embezzlement scandal, Christopher Kim (Kim Kyung-joon), to Korea on the request to prevent spreading controversies related to Lee Myung-bak's involvement in the BBK embezzlement scandal during the election season.

References

External links

Official Homepage of the National Election Commission 
Official Homepage of the NEC 
Official list of candidates Chosun Ilbo, 27 November 2007
Candidate profiles The Korea Times, 9 December 2007
Korea Society Podcast: 24 Hours After South Korea's Presidential Election: An Assessment

Presidential elections in South Korea
Presidential election
Lee Myung-bak